Molybdenum(IV) bromide, also known as molybdenum tetrabromide, is the inorganic compound with the formula MoBr4.  It is a black solid. MoBr4 has been prepared by treatment of molybdenum(V) chloride with hydrogen bromide:
2 MoCl5  + 10 HBr  →  2 MoBr4  +  10 HCl  +  Br2
The  reaction proceeds via the unstable molybdenum(V) bromide, which releases bromine at room temperature.

Molybdenum(IV) bromide can also be prepared by oxidation of molybdenum(III) bromide with bromine.

References

Bromides
Molybdenum halides
Molybdenum(IV) compounds